Daminon Teichos, also Daunium or Daunion (Δαύνιον), was a Greek city in ancient Thrace, located in the region of the Propontis.

It is cited in the Periplus of Pseudo-Scylax in its recitation of the towns of the area, appearing between Perinthus and Selymbria. It was a member of the Delian League and is cited on Athenian tribute registries between  454/3 and 418/7 BCE.

Its site is not located exactly, but it has been suggested that the area is located in the current Turkish coast near Gümüsyaka.

See also
Greek colonies in Thrace

References

Greek colonies in Thrace
Populated places in ancient Thrace
Former populated places in Turkey
Members of the Delian League
Lost ancient cities and towns